The GLAAD Media Award for Outstanding Reality Program is one of the annual GLAAD Media Awards which is offered to the best LGBT-related television series.

Winners and nominations

2000s

2010s

2020s

Programs with multiple awards

2 wins
 Project Runway 
 Queer Eye for the Straight Guy (consecutive)

Programs with multiple nominations

4 nominations
 The Amazing Race
 I Am Jazz
 RuPaul's Drag Race
 Queer Eye for the Straight Guy
 Project Runway

3 nominations
 Queer Eye
 The Real World
 Schitt's Creek

2 nominations
 Big Brother
 Big Freedia: Queen of Bounce
 Gaycation
 Girls Who Like Boys Who Like Boys	Sundance Channel
 I Am Cait
 Kathy Griffin: My Life on the D-List
 The Prancing Elites Project
 The Real L World
 Small Town Security
 Work Out
 The Voice

Notes
 A: Elliot Page was nominated before his gender transition in 2020.

References

GLAAD Media Awards
American film awards
American music awards
American television awards
American theater awards
American journalism awards